Abraham Olano Manzano (born 22 January 1970 in Anoeta, Gipuzkoa) is a Spanish retired professional road racing cyclist, who raced between 1992 and 2002. He won the World Road Championship in 1995, and the World Time Trial Championship in 1998, becoming the first and so far only male cyclist to win both.

He also achieved distinction in Grand Tours: he won Vuelta a España in 1998 and was second in 1995, made it twice to the final podium at Giro d'Italia (third in 1996 and second in 2001), and placed three times in the top-ten at Tour de France, with the fourth place in 1997 as his personal best. In total he won six stages in the Vuelta and one in the Tour, all of them time trials.

Olano was also double Spanish Champion in both road (1994) and time trial (1994 and 1998), olympic silver medalist in time trial in Atlanta 1996 and winner of several shorter stage races, like Tour of Romandie in 1996 and Critérium International and Tirreno–Adriatico in 2000.

Amateur career
Olano started racing 11 years old at the Oria Cycling school, and already at junior level he won several races.
Later, Olano went to track racing. He became Spanish Champion in pursuit (together with Etxegoyen, Pérez and Juárez), in the 1 km with standing start and in sprint.
In road racing, he started as an amateur for Kaiku and AVSA. He was specialized in sprinting.

Professional career
In 1992, Olano started his professional career at CHCS. This team shortly after disbanded, and he moved to Lotus. With Lotus, Olano won his first professional race, the Gran Premio de Villafranca de Ordizia in Gipuzkoa.

In 1993, Olano switched to CLAS Cajastur, which was later merged with Mapei. Here, he started to win important races, such as the Vuelta a Asturias and the Spanish National Road Race Championships, both in road race and time trial.

In 1995, Olano won three stages in the Vuelta a España, finishing second in overall classification to Laurent Jalabert. Later in the year Olano was a vital part of a hugely successful Spanish team at the World Cycling Championship in Colombia. In the time trial, Olano took silver, finishing second to Miguel Induráin. In the Road race, the top two positions was reversed, with Olano taking the Championship and Indurain silver. The route for the road race was one of the hardest courses ever for a World Championship, and Olano showed his stamina by riding the last kilometer solo with a flat tyre.

Olano established his abilities in stage races in 1996; he won the Tour de Romandie, finished third in the Giro d'Italia (leading the race at the second to last day), and finished ninth in the Tour de France. He also won the silver medal in the time trial at the 1996 Olympic Games, losing out to Miguel Induráin by a margin of only 12 seconds.

Olano finished fourth in the 1997 Tour de France, taking 1 stage win – a long time trial in Disneyland, ahead of the eventual Tour winner Jan Ullrich.

In 1998, Olano won his only grand tour, the Vuelta a España, fighting off furious challenges from mountain specialistsFernando Escartín and Roberto Heras as well as fellow all-rounders Laurent Jalabert and Alex Zülle, all at the height of their careers. Despite the victory, Olano was reportedly not happy with the support from the Banesto team and management. Banestos own mountain specialist José María Jiménez took 4 stage wins, on several occasions leaving Olano alone on the climbs, and even taking the Yellow Jersey from his team captain. Olano won back the jersey on the second time trial, but the events and subsequent media speculation soured his relationship with Banesto, and he decided for a switch to the ONCE team for the following season.

Olano finished 1998 in style, winning the World Championship Time Trial in Valkenburg, ahead of compatriot Melcior Mauri. Olano is the only male rider of the modern era to win the world Championship in both the Road race (1995) and the time trial (1998).

In 1999, Olano was back to defend the Vuelta title. In the prologue, severe rains put the late starters (including most of the GC contenders) at a big disadvantage, but Olano nevertheless managed to take 2nd place. In the stage 7 time trial, Olano won with a clear margin to main challenger Jan Ullrich, taking the top spot on the GC and the Yellow Jersey. Olano defended his lead through several mountain stages, but a crash on the stage to Alto de Angliru cost him a broken rib, and he was eventually forced to abandon the race.

In 2000, Olano made a shift in focusing on shorter stage races, and won Tirreno–Adriatico and Critérium International, among others. He would make his last mark at the grand Tours with a 2nd place in the 2001 Giro d'Italia. He retired from racing in 2002.

On account of results early in his career, a Basque background and some physical similarities, Olano was seen by many supporters as the successor to five-times Tour de France winner Miguel Induráin. The comparison would haunt Olano for all of his career, as he went on to have a career that was very successful by almost any other standard. Olano was one of the very best time trialists of his generation, and a rider with enormous stamina. However, he was a reluctant climber, and a tendency to lose valuable time to the specialists on the steepest and highest climbs, would keep his number of Grand Tour Wins to 1.

Doping revelations
Olano is one of the people responsible for designing stages for the Vuelta a España. He was fired from this position after a report from the French senate revealed that he had delivered a suspicious sample during the 1998 Tour de France, indicating use of EPO. The International Olympic Committee also refused to give the bronze medal to him, since Lance Armstrong had been doping like him.

Later life
In November 2006 Olano ran the San Sebastián marathon in a time of 2:39:19. In October 2015, he took over as new national coach for Gabon, with the task of building the national team "from scratch".

Career achievements

Major results

1992
 1st Prueba Villafranca de Ordizia
 3rd Clásica de Almería
1994
 National Road Championships
1st  Road race
1st  Time trial
 1st  Overall Clásica Internacional de Alcobendas
 1st  Overall Vuelta a Asturias
 5th Time trial, UCI Road World Championships
1995
 UCI Road World Championships
1st  Road race
2nd  Time trial
 2nd Overall Vuelta a España
1st Prologue, Stages 7 (ITT) & 20 (ITT)
 4th Overall Paris–Nice
1996
 1st  Overall Tour de Romandie
1st Stage 6 (ITT)
 1st  Overall Tour of Galicia
 2nd  Time trial, Olympic Games
 2nd Road race, National Road Championships
 2nd GP du Canton d'Argovie
 3rd Overall Giro d'Italia
Held  after Stage 20
 3rd Overall Tour of the Basque Country
 8th Time trial, UCI Road World Championships
 9th Overall Tour de France
1997
 1st  Overall Euskal Bizikleta
1st Stage 4b (ITT)
 1st Grand Prix Eddy Merckx
 2nd Overall Critérium du Dauphiné Libéré
 3rd Overall Vuelta a Aragón
 4th Overall Tour de France
1st Stage 20 (ITT)
1998
 1st  Time trial, UCI Road World Championships
 1st  Time trial, National Road Championships
 1st  Overall Vuelta a España
1st Stage 9 (ITT)
 1st  Overall Euskal Bizikleta
1st Stage 4b (ITT)
 1st Vuelta Ciclista a La Rioja
 1st Grand Prix Eddy Merckx
 6th Overall Volta a Catalunya
1999
 1st  Overall Vuelta a Burgos
 1st Stage 6 (ITT) Vuelta a España
 6th Overall Tour de France
2000
 1st  Overall Tirreno–Adriatico
1st Stage 5
 1st  Overall Volta a la Comunitat Valenciana
1st Stage 5b (ITT)
 1st  Overall Critérium International
 1st Stage 8 (ITT) Vuelta a España
 4th Time trial, Olympic Games
 5th Time trial, UCI Road World Championships
 8th Overall Tour Méditerranéen
2001
 1st  Overall Clásica de Alcobendas
 2nd Overall Giro d'Italia
 7th GP Primavera
2002
 1st Stage 4 (TTT) Tour de France
 2nd Road race, National Road Championships

General classification results timeline

References

External links
 Tour de France results
 

1970 births
Living people
Cyclists from the Basque Country (autonomous community)
Spanish male cyclists
Spanish Tour de France stage winners
Vuelta a España winners
Olympic cyclists of Spain
Cyclists at the 1996 Summer Olympics
Cyclists at the 2000 Summer Olympics
Olympic silver medalists for Spain
Spanish Vuelta a España stage winners
UCI Road World Champions (elite men)
Olympic medalists in cycling
People from Tolosaldea
Medalists at the 1996 Summer Olympics
Sportspeople from Gipuzkoa